Joel Edmund Cohen (born August 23, 1963) is an American screenwriter who has worked on such projects as the movies Cheaper by the Dozen, Toy Story, Money Talks and Garfield: The Movie. He frequently works with his writing partner Alec Sokolow.

Along with Joss Whedon, Andrew Stanton, John Lasseter, Pete Docter, Joe Ranft, and Sokolow, Cohen was nominated in 1996 for the Academy Award for Best Writing (Original Screenplay) for his work on Toy Story. Beyond writing, Cohen and Sokolow jointly directed Monster Mash: The Movie (1995) and executively produced Gnomes and Trolls: The Secret Chamber (2008).

Selected writing credits

Films
Hot Money (1983)
Sister, Sister (1987)
Pass the Ammo (1988)
Toy Story (1995)
Monster Mash: The Movie (1995)
Money Talks (1997)
Goodbye Lover (1998)
Cheaper by the Dozen (2003)
Garfield: The Movie (2004)
Garfield: A Tail of Two Kitties (2006)
Evan Almighty (2007)
Daddy Day Camp (2007)
Gnomes and Trolls: The Secret Chamber (2008)

Video games
Freaky Flyers (2003)
Skylanders: Spyro's Adventure (2011)

References

External links

Living people
American male writers
Annie Award winners
Place of birth missing (living people)
American male screenwriters
Video game writers
1963 births